Linsidomine (3-morpholinosydnonimine or SIN-1) is a vasodilator. It is a metabolite of the antianginal drug molsidomine and acts by releasing NO from the endothelial cells nonenzymatically. It also hyperpolarizes the cell membrane through influencing the sodium-potassium pump and thereby rendering it less responsive to adrenergic stimulation. Linsidomine injection at a dose of 1 mg produces usable erection in about 70% of patients and full erection in up to 50% of patients. Linsidomine does not appear to be associated with priapism.

Linsidomine is neurotoxic and promotes oxidative stress on neurons. Linsidomine is a peroxynitrite-generating compound involved in the pathogenesis of neurodegenerative diseases.

References 

4-Morpholinyl compunds
Vasodilators
Oxadiazoles